Hopea nutans is a large rainforest tree species in the family Dipterocarpaceae. It is found in Peninsular Malaysia and Borneo. The tallest measured specimen is 82.8 m tall in the Tawau Hills National Park, in Sabah on the island of Borneo.

References

nutans
Trees of Borneo
Trees of Peninsular Malaysia
Critically endangered flora of Asia
Taxonomy articles created by Polbot